Richard Burr Rutherford (April 11, 1891 – February 16, 1976) was an American football and basketball coach. He served as the head football coach at Washington University in St. Louis from 1917 to 1919 and at Oregon Agricultural College, now Oregon State University, from 1920 to 1923, compiling a career college football record of 28–19–6. Rutherford was also the head basketball coach at Washington University from 1917 to 1920 and at Oregon Agricultural from 1920 to 1922, tallying a career college basketball mark of 58–41. He died in 1976 in California.

Coaching career

Football
Rutherford was the head coach of the Oregon State Beavers football team from 1920 to 1923. During his tenure there, he compiled a 13–14–6 record.

1923 Civil War
This Civil War was played at Hayward Field before 12,000 fans on November 25, 1923. It had been 15 years since Oregon State had beaten the University of Oregon in Eugene. In fact, in the 29 years the rivalry had been contested, Oregon Agricultural College had only beaten Oregon on the road on two other occasions, making this an era when most Beaver fans took it as a given that a trip "south to Lane County" was as good as a loss. OAC coach R.B. Rutherford and team captain Percy Locey felt otherwise. So did quarterback Roy Price. In the second quarter, Price took a Webfoot punt on his own 23-yard line and didn't stop until he had reached the Oregon end zone for the game's only score. Rutherford and the Beavers team won, 6–0. This game is still known as one of the greatest "Civil War" games.

Basketball
From 1920 to 1922, Rutherford also coached the Oregon State Beavers basketball team. In his two seasons as the head basketball coach, he posted a 27–19 record.  He is one of three people to have coached both teams.

Head coaching record

Football

References

1891 births
1976 deaths
Basketball coaches from Nebraska
Oregon State Beavers football coaches
Oregon State Beavers men's basketball coaches
Washington University Bears football coaches
Washington University Bears men's basketball coaches
People from Beatrice, Nebraska